Pierre Balthasar de Muralt (1921, Vevey, – 24 March 2013, Vevey) was a Swiss typographer and publisher. He was responsible for developing Éditions Rencontre into one  of the largest francophone book clubs in the world.

He was a descendant of the Sulzer family who founded Sulzer Ltd. in the nineteenth century. He completed his military service and gained a Law doctorate at the University of Lausanne before studying typographer in Paris. He collaborated with the Vaudois League, a political current influenced by the integral nationalism of Charles Maurras.

References

1921 births
2013 deaths
Swiss publishers (people)
Swiss typographers and type designers